York Capital Management is a global institutional investment management firm with approximately $18.5 billion in assets under management as of June 2019. The firm was founded in 1991 by Jamie Dinan.

York Capital is headquartered in New York City, with additional offices in London and Hong Kong. As of December 2012, York Capital was ranked as the 20th largest hedge fund in the world.

In 2010, Credit Suisse acquired a 30% stake in York Capital for $425 million.

History
York Capital was founded in 1991 by Jamie Dinan and named after the street he was then living on, York Avenue. Jamie Dinan started his career at the merger arbitrage firm Kellner DiLeo & Company. In 1987, the market crashed and he lost his entire $600,000 in savings. In 1991, he was able to raise $3.6 million from his former DLJ colleagues and started York Capital. In 1993, his fund earned credibility with a 33.8 percent return and by 2000, the fund had over $610 million in assets.

In February 2023, York Capital Management portfolio company American Car Center ended operations.

Investment strategies
York Capital uses a fundamental analysis, bottom-up approach to make its investments. The firm focuses on three event-driven investing strategies: merger and acquisition transactions, distressed securities and restructuring opportunities and special situation equity investing.

York Capital Funds
Global Multi-Strategy Funds
	York Multi-Strategy
	York Select 
	York Total Return

Distressed Opportunities Funds
	York Credit 
	York Credit Income

Regional Multi-Strategy Funds
	York European Opportunities 
	York Asian Opportunities

References

Hedge funds
Hedge fund firms in New York City
Alternative investment management companies
Institutional investors